The 1988 United States Senate election in Wisconsin took place on November 8, 1988. Incumbent Democratic U.S. Senator William Proxmire decided to retire, instead of running for re-election to a sixth full term. Democrat Herb Kohl won the open seat.

Democratic primary

Candidates 
 Tony Earl, former Governor of Wisconsin
 Ed Garvey, 1986 U.S. Senate candidate
 Edmond C. Hou-Seye
 Herb Kohl, businessman & former chairman of the Democratic Party of Wisconsin
 Doug La Follette, Secretary of State of Wisconsin

Results

Republican primary

Candidates 
 Susan Engeleiter, State Senator
 Steve King, Chairman of the Republican Party of Wisconsin
 Peter Y. Taylor

Results

Results

See also 
 1988 United States Senate elections

References

External links 

Wisconsin
1988
1988 Wisconsin elections